Olio is a book of poetry written by Tyehimba Jess that was released in 2016. The book is split into 16 sections, 14 of which are poems with the introduction section and extras and acknowledgments acting as the beginning and ending sections, and illustrated by Jessica Lynne Brown. Olio won the 2017 Pulitzer Prize for Poetry.

Purpose
Jess' purpose behind writing Olio was to put together the work of first-generation freed slaves to share their story and their suffering, as well as to create a piece of work that each reader will experience differently.

"Fix your eyes on the flex of these first-generation-freed voices: They coalesce in counterpoint, name nemeses, summon tongue to wit-ness. Weave your own chosen way between these voices". (Jess 3)

Characters 
John William Boone (1864-1927)
Henry Brown
Paul Laurence Dunbar (1872-1906)
The Fisk Jubilee Singers
Ernest Hogan (1865–1909)
Sissieretta Jones (1868–1933)
Scott Joplin (1867–1917)
Millie and Christine McKoy (1851–1912)
Booker T. Washington (1856–1915)
Tom Wiggins (1849–1908)
Bert Williams and George Walker
Edmonia Lewis (1844–1907)

References

External links
 Book's publisher page

American poetry collections
2016 poetry books
Pulitzer Prize for Poetry-winning works